Behabad (also Romanized as Behābād; also known as Bahāābād) is a village in Howmeh Rural District, in the Central District of Gonabad County, Razavi Khorasan Province, Iran. At the 2006 census, its population was 1,423, in 389 families.

See also 

 List of cities, towns and villages in Razavi Khorasan Province

References 

Populated places in Gonabad County